The 1953 season was Wisła Krakóws 45th year as a club. Wisła was under the name of Gwardia Kraków.

Friendlies

Mixed teams

Ekstraklasa

1953-54 Polish Cup

Squad, appearances and goals

|-
|}

Goalscorers

Disciplinary record

External links
1953 Wisła Kraków season at historiawisly.pl
Wisła in 1953 Ekstraklasa

Wisła Kraków seasons
Association football clubs 1953 season
Wisla